Benjamin Becker (born 16 June 1981) is a German retired professional tennis player who is known for defeating former world No. 1 Andre Agassi in the third round at the 2006 US Open in what was Agassi's last match as a professional player.

Becker has reached a career-high ATP ranking of No. 35 in singles on October 27, 2014, and No. 58 in doubles on July 5, 2010.

Becker has no relation to Boris Becker, another German tennis player who was ranked as high as world No. 1 and won Wimbledon three times.

Early life and family
Benjamin Becker was born on 16 June 1981 in Merzig, West Germany, to Jörg, a tax office worker, and Ulrike. Becker has one younger sister. From 2001 to 2005, Becker played tennis at Baylor University, winning the NCAA singles championship as a junior in 2004 and leading the Bears to the team title that year. In 2005, the team finished runner-up at the NCAA tournament and won the ITA team indoor championship. He is the school's all-time leader in singles and doubles wins.  A rarity in men's tennis, Becker attended college for four years before turning professional.

Career

2006
2006 was a breakthrough year for Becker. In June of that year, he qualified for Wimbledon and defeated Juan Ignacio Chela, before losing in the second round to Fernando Verdasco. At the 2006 US Open, he defeated Filippo Volandri and No. 30 seed Sébastien Grosjean to reach the third round, where he defeated former world No. 1 Andre Agassi in four sets. The match was especially noteworthy as it was Agassi's last on the ATP circuit; he had announced that the 2006 U.S. Open would be his final tournament, and his defeat was followed by an 8-minute standing ovation from the Arthur Ashe Stadium crowd. The day after Becker's win over Agassi, his own U.S. Open bid was ended by Andy Roddick in the fourth round.

Becker has the distinction of having played the match that finished second latest in ATP history, defeating Jiří Novák in Tokyo in 2006 at 3.24 a.m. Following the 2006 U.S. Open, Becker confirmed his status as a promising newcomer on the ATP Tour, improving his ranking from No. 421 at the beginning of the year to No. 62 in November 2006. As a result, Becker received the Newcomer of the Year award during the 2006 ATP Awards and won the Sportsman of the Year award in his part of Germany. After completing his first season on the ATP Tour, Becker made the fastest rise of any player into the top 50.

2007
2007 saw Becker improving his ranking further in the early season, including through his semi-final appearances at the Delray Beach International Tennis Championships, where he lost to world No. 8 James Blake; and in San Jose at the SAP Open where he lost to Ivo Karlović, the tallest player on the ATP Tour (6' 10"). As a result, Becker's ATP ranking peaked at No. 38 in March 2007. However, in 2007 Becker was unable to progress beyond the first round in any of the Grand Slams or ATP Masters Series events, with the exception of the Monte Carlo Masters, where he lost in the second round to Thomas Johansson.

Given his strong performance at the U.S. Open in the preceding year, Becker's first round loss in the 2007 edition caused his ranking to drop to 79. Despite good form in Bangkok, where he lost in the finals to Dmitry Tursunov, Becker finished the year ranked 84th.

2009
In 2009, Becker won his first ATP World Tour title, the Ordina Open in the Netherlands, defeating local hope Raemon Sluiter.

2010

Becker reached the semifinal of the Gerry Weber Open in Halle, the Ordina Open in 's-Hertogenbosch and the Thailand Open in Bangkok. At the Grand Slam tournaments, Becker reached the second round of the 2010 Australian Open as well as in Wimbledon and at the 2010 US Open. He was knocked out in the first round at the 2010 French Open. He qualified for the ATP World Tour Masters 1000 tournament in Shanghai, but lost to Gaël Monfils in the first round. He advanced to the second round of the If Stockholm Open, where he lost to second seed Robin Söderling. He reached the quarterfinals at St.Petersburg, where he lost to Illya Marchenko. He qualified for the BNP Paribas Open in Paris-Bercy, where he lost to Gaël Monfils in the second round after a first-round win over Denis Istomin. He went 29–31 on the season and earned a career-high $543,431.

2011
Becker reached the second round in Brisbane and at the Australian Open, losing to Santiago Giraldo and Alexandr Dolgopolov. He also reached the second round at Indian Wells. The rest of the year, he played mostly Challenger tournaments.

2012
In 2012, Becker reached the second round in Doha, losing to Gaël Monfils, but he was eliminated in the first round of the Australian Open by Marcos Baghdatis. His best run of the year was in Memphis, where he reached the semifinals, defeating Dudi Sela, Xavier Malisse, and Łukasz Kubot, before succumbing to Milos Raonic. He defeated Olivier Rochus in the first round in Miami, but then lost to Julien Benneteau. He won a Challenger title in Nottingham, before reaching the second round at Wimbledon with a win over James Blake. He was eliminated by Radek Štěpánek.

Becker made the quarterfinals in Newport, Rhode Island, avenging his loss to Raonic in the second round, but losing to Ryan Harrison. In Washington, D.C., he defeated one American, Steve Johnson, in the first round, but fell to another, Sam Querrey, in the second. He also made the second round in Winston-Salem, defeating Tatsuma Ito, but losing to Jarkko Nieminen.

2013
Becker reached the second round of the Australian Open, losing to Juan Martín del Potro. He then suffered a succession of first-round exits before again reaching the final in Nottingham, where he lost to Matthew Ebden. At the Aegon Championships, he reached the quarterfinals, defeating Bernard Tomic, Lukáš Rosol, and Alexandr Dolgopolov, before losing to eventual champion Andy Murray. At Wimbledon, he went down to Murray again in the first round.

Becker won a Challenger event in Istanbul in July. At Cincinnati, he qualified and reached the second round, only to lose to Rafael Nadal. At the US Open, he defeated Lukáš Rosol in the first round, but lost to Novak Djokovic in the second. He reached the quarterfinals in Metz with wins over two Frenchmen, Benoît Paire and Albano Olivetti, but lost to another, Nicolas Mahut. Becker won another Challenger tournament in Eckental, Germany, in October.

2014: Career high ranking
In 2014, Becker reached the second round at Chennai, losing to eventual champion Stanislas Wawrinka. He also reached the second round in Memphis, defeating Lukáš Lacko, but succumbing to eventual champion Kei Nishikori. In Miami, he qualified and made the fourth round of the main draw, where he lost to Milos Raonic. In Houston, he made the second round, where he was eliminated by Jack Sock. He made the final of the 2014 Topshelf Open grass tournament that he had won in 2009, but he lost in the final to Roberto Bautista Agut.

ATP career finals

Singles: 3 (1 title, 2 runner-ups)

Doubles: 2 (2 runner-ups)

Challenger finals

Singles: 18 (9–9)

Performance timelines

Singles

2015 French Open counts as 2 wins, 0 losses. Kei Nishikori received a walkover in the third round, after Becker withdrew because of a muscle tear in his right shoulder, does not count as a Becker loss (nor a Nishikori win).

Doubles

Wins over top 10 players

References

External links
 
 
 
 
 
 

1981 births
Baylor Bears men's tennis players
German expatriates in the United States
German male tennis players
Living people
People from Merzig-Wadern